Roadgames (stylized as Road Games) is a 1981 Australian thriller film directed by Richard Franklin and starring Stacy Keach and Jamie Lee Curtis. The film follows a truck driver travelling across Australia who, along with the help of a hitchhiker, seeks to track down a serial killer who is butchering women and dumping their dismembered bodies along desolate highways.

Plot
In rural Australia, truck driver Patrick Quid pulls into a motel for the night and notices a man in a green van checking in with a female hitchhiker. Quid had passed the hitchhiker earlier because trucking company policy forbade him from picking her up. In the motel room, the hitchhiker strums a guitar while the man unpacks a new guitar string. The man winds the string around his gloved hands and uses it to strangle the woman.

Quid wakes the next morning in his truck. His pet dingo sniffs relentlessly at the garbage outside the motel, and Quid notices the van driver watching the dingo from the window of the motel room. Quid picks up a load of pigs from Universal Meats. He sets off for Perth with his load and passes various characters on the road: a nagging wife and her family, a cautious man hauling a sailboat, and a station wagon crammed full of toy balls. He repeatedly passes by another female hitchhiker.

The wife creates a roadblock by streaming pink paper across the highway. When Quid stops at the sight of it, she climbs into his cab and orders Quid to catch up with her husband who left her at the side of the road. They play 20 Questions to pass the time. The wife informs Quid about the grisly murder of a woman and his nonchalant answers start to disturb her. She suspects that he might be the serial killer from the news. 

Quid stops the truck when he sees the green van parked along the road. Its driver has several trash bags and an esky; he appears to be burying the bags. When the van driver notices Quid watching him through binoculars, he abandons his work and drives away. Later, at a roadhouse, the van driver assaults Quid's dingo. Quid gives chase, but he encounters the slow-driving boat owner, who refuses to let Quid pass. Eventually, Quid destroys the boat, but the van is too far off to catch.

Quid picks up the second female hitchhiker, Pamela Rushworth, that he has passed before. She gradually reveals that she is the daughter of a powerful American diplomat. Quid urges Pamela to let her father know that she is alright. The duo discuss the serial killer. At a service station, they notice the van parked near the restroom. Quid sees a pair of feet in the toilet stall and he thinks he has the killer cornered. Pamela investigates the van while Quid tries to get the man to exit the stall. As Pamela reaches for the esky inside the van, she realizes that the driver is sleeping on the floor. In the restroom, a biker emerges from the stall. Quid rushes outside to see that the van is gone.

When Quid catches up to the van, it appears that Pamela is happily in the passenger seat. Later that night, Quid notices the van parked off the side of the road and pulls over to investigate. He hears people giggling in the bushes nearby and assumes that Pamela and the van driver are engaged in sex. When he breaks into the van to investigate, he finds that the esky only contains food.

Quid arrives at the outskirts of Perth and, while reporting to the weigh station, sees the van. He follows the van through the streets of Perth, trailed by the police. Eventually the van reaches a dead end and Quid's truck becomes stuck in the narrow alleys. The van driver approaches Quid's truck and attempts to strangle him with a garrotte, but Quid manages to disarm him. When Quid starts to strangle the van driver with the same weapon, the police arrive and assume that Quid is the killer. Upon freeing a gagged and bound Pamela from the van, the police learn that Quid is innocent, and Pamela's actual captor is caught whilst trying to escape through the crowd.

When Quid finally delivers the meat shipment, he relates to Pamela that after he had found his trailer door open and discovered the load weight a few kilos over, he had presumed that the van driver had killed her and disposed of her inside his trailer. Back at the meat facility, a woman cleaning out the back of the trailer is brushed by a guitar string hanging from the ceiling and, on pulling it, gets a nasty surprise as a human head falls from above and lands in her soap bucket.

Cast

Production

Development 
While making the film Patrick Richard Franklin gave Everett De Roche a copy of Rear Window as an example of how he wanted the script typed. De Roche loved the content of the script and expressed his desire to write a film with a similar plot but set on a moving vehicle. He developed the idea with Franklin in Fiji, where the latter was co-producing The Blue Lagoon (1980). De Roche wrote the first draft of Roadgames over a period of 8 days in a hotel, with Franklin visiting periodically during breaks in the production of Blue Lagoon.

Filming
Shot on location in the Nullarbor Plain and in Melbourne, the budget of $1.75 million was the highest ever for an Australian film at that time. Avco Embassy paid $500,000 for all rights outside Australia, and the balance came from the Greater Union, the Australian Film Commission, the Victorian Film Corporation, and the Western Australian Film Council.

Casting
Franklin wanted to cast Sean Connery in the lead, but was unable to afford his salary, and the role went to Stacy Keach instead.

Australian actress Lisa Peers was cast to play opposite him, but the US distributors insisted on an American co-star, so Franklin cast Jamie Lee Curtis. The film ran into trouble with Actors Equity when the Melbourne branch of the union approved the importation of Curtis, but the Sydney branch opposed it. "We found ourselves as the ping-pong ball in a game of politics between Melbourne and Sydney, and it nearly resulted in the film closing down," said Franklin. Franklin later acknowledged wishing he had increased the size of Curtis' part to take more advantage of her.

Release

Home media
The film was first released on VHS in Australia by Star Video in the early 1980s. In the US, the first VHS release was handled by Embassy Home Entertainment and later in the 1990s by Nelson Entertainment. Roadgames was first released on DVD in the United States on 10 June 2003 by Anchor Bay Entertainment, this release has long gone out of print with copies running at $85 on Amazon.com. In Australia, Umbrella Entertainment released a special edition DVD in 2004–this DVD is also no-longer in print. In April 2016, it was announced that Umbrella would release a new 4k restoration of the film for the first time on Blu-ray disc. Scream Factory released it on Blu-ray in a special edition form on 12 November 2019.

Reception

Box office
Roadgames was a box office bomb in Australia upon its June 1981 release. It was released theatrically in the United States in November 1981, and similarly did not perform as well as originally expected, which Franklin blamed on its marketing as a slasher film. However, it did lead to Franklin landing the job of directing Psycho II in 1983.

Critical response
Variety gave the film a positive review, calling it "an above-average suspenser." The New York Times, however, gave the film a middling review, saying: "Although Road Games was made in Australia, the Outback might as well be the New Jersey Turnpike." Time Out gave the film a positive review, saying: "It's precisely its pretensions which make this a surprisingly agreeable cross of angst-ridden '70s road movie with Hitchcockian thriller...  Effective as a string of cinematic shocks, the movie manages a good number of coups, with its cargo of raw meat, use of Jamie Lee's association with endless knife-flicks, and the ever-so-slightly surreal placing of figures in a vast landscape, making for an endearing horror pic."

Accolades

Legacy
The film has been cited by Quentin Tarantino as one of his favourite films, and also served as influence in Australian director Greg McLean's debut feature, Wolf Creek (2005).

See also
Cinema of Australia

References

Bibliography

External links

Road Games at Oz Movies
Road Games at the National Film and Sound Archive
Road Games OST track listing on 1M1 Records' website
IMDb awards

1981 films
1981 horror films
1981 thriller films
Australian thriller films
Australian horror films
Australian slasher films
1980s English-language films
Australian road movies
1980s road movies
1980s slasher films
Trucker films
Films directed by Richard Franklin (director)
Films set in Western Australia
Films set in South Australia
Films about hitchhiking
Films scored by Brian May (composer)